Heinz Gerstinger (born October 13, 1919 in Vienna; died April 28, 2016) was an Austrian writer, playwright and historian.

Biography 
Heinz Gerstinger studied history and dramatics at the University of Vienna. He has worked for the universities of Graz and Vienna as well as for theaters in Graz, Augsburg and Vienna. While publishing in literary magazines and newspapers, he worked for the Austrian radio and television. Heinz Gerstinger was a member of the Austrian P.E.N. and the writers' association Österreichischer Schriftstellerverband.

Works

Movie 
 As an actor: Bernhard Wicki (director):  following the book by Joseph Roth

Literature 
 Calderón, Velber Hannover, Friedrich 1967
 Spanische Komödie – Lope de Vega und seine Zeitgenossen, Friedrich Velber Verlag, Hannover 1968
 Theater und Religion heute, 1972
 Der Dramatiker Anton Wildgans, 1981
 Österreich, holdes Märchen und böser Traum – August Strindbergs Ehe mit Frida Uhl, Herold, Vienna 1981
 Der Dramatiker Hans Krendlesberger, Wagner, Innsbruck 1981
 Wien von gestern – ein literarischer Streifzug durch die Kaiserstadt, Edition Wien, Vienna 1991, 
 Frau Venus reitet... – Die phantastische Geschichte des Ulrich von Lichtenstein, 1995
 Ausflugsziel Burgen – 30 Burgen rund um Wien, Pichler, Vienna 1998, 
 Altwiener literarische Salons – Wiener Salonkultur vom Rokoko bis zur Neoromantik (1777–1907), Akademische Verlagsanstalt Salzburg 2002, 
 Der heilige Dämon – Gregor VII, Faksimile Verlag, Graz/Salzburg,

Notes

External links 

Critical review on Ausflugsziel Burgen, in German

Austrian male writers
Writers from Vienna
1919 births
2016 deaths